Adílson Warken (born 16 January 1987) is a Brazilian retired footballer who played as a defensive midfielder.

Career

Grêmio
Born in Bom Princípio, Rio Grande do Sul, Adílson started his career at Caxias in 2005, before joining the Grêmio youth setup in the following year. He was promoted to the senior squad in 2007 and amassed a total of 14 official appearances throughout his two first professional seasons. In 2009, Adílson made his breakthrough into the starting lineup, playing 34 matches in the 2009 Série A and starting in all 12 of Grêmio's semifinalist campaign at the 2009 Copa Libertadores. His first goal came in a Série A 4–2 victory over Barueri on 29 November 2009. In 2010, he won his second Campeonato Gaúcho trophy with Grêmio.

Terek Grozny
On 24 December 2011, Terek Grozny confirmed the signing of Adílson. In July 2016, Adílson underwent Pubic symphysis surgery, ruling him out of the start of the new season.
After five years with Terek Grozny, making over 100 appearances for the club, Adílson's contract was terminated by mutual consent on 28 February 2017.

Atlético Mineiro
On 3 March 2017, Adílson joined Atlético Mineiro. In his first season, he won the 2017 Campeonato Mineiro.

On 12 July 2019, Adílson announced his retirement as a professional footballer after being diagnosed with hypertrophic cardiomyopathy.

Career statistics

Club

Honours
Grêmio
Campeonato Gaúcho: 2007, 2010

Atlético Mineiro
Campeonato Mineiro: 2017

References

External links

 sambafoot
  CBF
 Guardian Stats Centre
  zerozero.pt
  globoesporte
  gremio.net

1987 births
Living people
Sportspeople from Rio Grande do Sul
Brazilian footballers
Brazilian expatriate footballers
Association football midfielders
Sociedade Esportiva e Recreativa Caxias do Sul players
Grêmio Foot-Ball Porto Alegrense players
Brazilian people of German descent
Russian Premier League players
Expatriate footballers in Russia
FC Akhmat Grozny players
Clube Atlético Mineiro players